Payithiyakaran (English title: Madman?) is a 1947 Tamil-language film produced by and starring N. S. Krishnan. It was based on the play of the same name staged by Krishnan's drama troupe. It was the first film for Krishnan after his acquittal in the Lakshmikanthan murder case. M. G. Ramachandran played a supporting role in the film.

Plot
Paithiyakaran was based on V. Shantaram's Duniya Na Mane, which in turn was based on the Marathi novel, Na Patnari Goshta by written by Narayan Hari Apte. It was a socially themed movie which advocated for widow remarriage and against older men marrying women much younger than them.

Cast
Cast according to the opening credits of the film

Male cast
 M. G. R as Moorthi
 N. S. K
 Mathuram
 Sahasra Namam as Sekhar
 Kaka Radhakrishnan
 C. S. Pandian
 D. Balasubramaniam
 K. Chandrasekharan

Female cast
 S. J. Kantha
 T. A. Jayalakshmi
 S. R. Janaki
 Saraswathi 
 Baby Vadiva
 Bhagavathi
 Saroja (Dance)

Production

When N. S. Krishnan was in prison for the Lakshmikanthan murder case, his wife and comedian T. A. Mathuram started a drama troupe called N. S. K Nataka Sabha. The troupe mainly staged plays written by and starring S. V. Sahasranamam. Paithiyakaran (lit. The mad man) was one of those plays. When Krishnan was first sentenced to jail, Mathuram took a break from her acting career. Later she came out her self-imposed exile to generate revenues for financing her husband's appeal to the privy council. Paithiyakaran was based on V. Shantaram's 1937 film Duniya Na Mane. Mathuram converted the troupe into a film production company and made a film based on the play. The film advocated reformist social policies like widow remarriage.  It was directed by the director duo of P. Krishnan and S. Panju. While the film was in production, Krishnan was acquitted in the murder case and was released from prison. A new role was written for him in the film. Mathuram played dual roles as the heroine and as Krishnan's comedic foil. Krishnan made fun of his stint in prison through the song jailukku poi vantha in which he described in prison life, his fellow inmates and the types of prisoners he met. Music for the film was composed by C. R. Subburaman and M. S. Gnanamani. Pattukoru pulavan bharathi - a work of the poet Kavimani Desigavinayagam Pillai was used in the film as lyrics for a song featuring T. A. Jayalakshmi. M. G. Ramachandran (later Chief minister of Tamil Nadu) played a supporting role in the film. The completed film was 16,201 feet in length. According to The Hindu and The New Indian Express, S. S. Rajendran played a minor role.

Reception
The film was released on 26 September 1947 and was a box office hit. The film's success enabled Mathuram's production house to produce four more films and N. S. Krishnan began a successful stint as director.

References

External links
 

1947 films
Films directed by Krishnan–Panju
1940s Tamil-language films
Films scored by M. S. Gnanamani
Films scored by C. R. Subbaraman
Indian films based on plays
Indian comedy-drama films
Films about widowhood in India
1947 comedy-drama films
Indian black-and-white films